Craig Richard Mitchell (born 6 May 1985) is an English former professional footballer who played in the Football League for Mansfield Town.

References

1985 births
Living people
English footballers
Association football forwards
English Football League players
Mansfield Town F.C. players
Northwich Victoria F.C. players
Leigh Genesis F.C. players
Sutton Town A.F.C. players
Worksop Town F.C. players
Alfreton Town F.C. players
Glapwell F.C. players